The Napier-Heston Racer, also referred to as the Heston Type 5 Racer or Heston High Speed Aircraft J.5, was a 1940s British single-seat racing monoplane first conceived by D. Napier and Son Ltd., and built by the Heston Aircraft Company Ltd, for an attempt on the World Air Speed Record. The private venture was financed by William Morris, Lord Nuffield.

Design and development
The Napier-Heston Racer design team was led by Arthur Ernest Hagg of Napier & Son, and George Cornwall of Heston Aircraft Company Ltd. It was a single-engined, low-wing cantilever monoplane, purpose-built as a contender for the World Speed Record. It was built almost entirely of wood, that served to ensure rapid construction, a "superfine" finish, and streamlined, "beautiful" lines. The use of a multi-ducted belly scoop and clear, low profile perspex canopy, along with a reputed 20 coats of hand-rubbed lacquer also contributed to the sleek aerodynamic finish. Saunders-Roe provided wing spars made of "Compregnated wood", a system that involved multiple laminations bonded with resin under high pressure.

Diminutive, thin-sectioned symmetrical wing airfoils were designed for high-speed flight. The elevator control circuit was designed by Heston Aircraft Company's Chief Draughtsman, C.G.W Ebbutt, with a variable ratio- with the stick near the neutral position, large movements could be made with small resulting pitch movements. This was needed for accurate handling at low level and high speed (the 3 km airspeed record course had to be flown under 100 ft above sea level). Towards the ends of the control column movement, the ratio increased to allow utilisation of the full range of elevator travel.

The aircraft's design parameters were purposely designed around a top secret, untested, 24-cylinder, 2,450 hp liquid-cooled Napier Sabre engine. Although originally proposed to the Air Ministry and receiving approval as primarily an engine programme, the Napier-Heston Racer was ultimately not officially sanctioned and had to proceed as a private venture with Lord Nuffield entirely underwriting the project.

Operational history
The first aircraft of two planned for the record attempt, registered G-AFOK (call sign Fox Oboe King), had its maiden flight at Heston Aerodrome on 12 June 1940, piloted by Squadron Leader G.L.G. Richmond, Chief Test Pilot of Heston Aircraft.  The takeoff was not without drama and a heavy bump during the high speed run in takeoff configuration (with the constricted canopy removed for the test flight), launched the Racer prematurely into the air.

Recovering from the abrupt takeoff, Richmond carried out a preliminary test flight with gear extended throughout but after only five minutes airborne, while encountering inadequate elevator control, the engine overheated. According to some accounts, Richmond was being scalded by steam from the radiator mounted below the cockpit, and in haste to carry out a forced landing, inadvertently stalled the aircraft at approximately 30 ft above the airfield. Other sources state that the coolant leak only occurred after impact. The aircraft impacted heavily, with the undercarriage driven through the wings, and the tail broken off. Richmond survived with minor injuries, chiefly burns.

Napier had ordered two examples in 1938, but with the destruction of the first prototype, the Napier-Heston programme was discontinued despite 80% completion of the second aircraft, G-AFOL, the No. 2 (as it was commonly known).

Specifications

Comparable aircraft
Hughes H-1 Racer: 352 mph in 1935 (unofficial world record).
Messerschmitt Bf 109 V-13, D-IPKY: 379 mph on 11 November 1937 (unofficial world record)
Heinkel He 100 V-2: 394.6 mph in June 1938; V-8: 463.9 mph on 30 March 1939 (both unofficial world records)
Supermarine Speed Spitfire: 408 mph in February 1939 (not during a record attempt)
Messerschmitt Me 209 V-1: 469 mph on 26 April 1939 (FAI landplane airspeed world record)

References

Notes

Bibliography

 Clare, R.A. "Napier-Heston Racer Postscript". Aeroplane Monthly, August 1976. IPC Media.
 Cowin, Hugh W. The Risk Takers, A Unique Pictorial Record 1908–1972: Racing & Record-setting Aircraft (Aviation Pioneer 2). London: Osprey Aviation, 1999. .
 Gunston, Bill. "The Napier-Heston Racer". Aeroplane Monthly, June 1976. IPC Media.
The Illustrated Encyclopedia of Aircraft (Part Work 1982–1985). London: Orbis Publishing, 1985, p. 2158.
 Jackson, A.J. British Civil Aircraft since 1919, Vol. 3. London: Putnam, 1974. .
 Lewis, Peter. "Heston Aircraft." Air Pictorial, Volume 34, no. 11, November 1972. 
 Meaden, Jack. "The Heston-Napier Racer and World Records". Air-Britain Archive (quarterly), Summer 2006.

External links

 Air Racing History website: Napier-Heston Racer
 Heston J-5 Napier Racer, technical data, in German only

1940s British experimental aircraft
1940s British sport aircraft
Heston aircraft
Low-wing aircraft
Single-engined tractor aircraft
Aircraft first flown in 1940